The Last of the Mohicans is an EP by English new wave band Bow Wow Wow, released in May 1982 by RCA Records. It was produced by Kenny Laguna of Joan Jett & the Blackhearts fame.

The Last of the Mohicans peaked at number 67 on the Billboard 200, Bow Wow Wow's highest entry on the chart. The EP contains the band's biggest hit, a cover of the Strangeloves' "I Want Candy".

The cover photograph, taken by Andy Earl, depicts Bow Wow Wow recreating Le Déjeuner sur l'herbe by Édouard Manet, and caused outrage when it first appeared as the cover of the band's debut album See Jungle! See Jungle! Go Join Your Gang Yeah, City All Over! Go Ape Crazy!.

Track listing

Notes
 "Cowboy" is credited as being written by Ashman, Barbarossa, Gorman and McLaren on The Last of the Mohicans. Later releases, including the 1982 compilation album I Want Candy, have credited it as being written by Ashman, Barbarossa, Gorman, Grillet and Pietri. Sources such as the American Society of Composers, Authors and Publishers and the Australasian Performing Right Association continue to credit McLaren as a writer on the song.

Charts

References

External links
 
 

1982 EPs
Bow Wow Wow albums
RCA Records EPs